In Greek mythology, Byssa is a Koan woman who refused to honour the deities Artemis, Athena and Hermes, and was turned into a bird for her impiety. Her tale survives in the works of Antoninus Liberalis.

Family 
Byssa was the daughter of Eumelus and the sister of Meropis and Agron.

Mythology 
Byssa with her family dwelled with Meropis on Kos island, and though they honored the local Koan goddess, they refused to venerate Artemis, Athena and Hermes. Every time the other islanders would invite them to a feast or sacrifice in honour of those gods they would refuse, on account of them hating grey eyes, owls, a goddess who was out at night, and thieves.

Artemis, Athena and Hermes paid them a visit one night, disguised as two countryside maidens and a shepherd. Hermes persuaded Agron and Eumelus to sacrifice to Hermes, Byssa and Meropis to the goddesses. They still denied however, so all four were turned into birds. Byssa became a byssa bird, sacred to the goddess Leucothea.  It has been suggested to be some sort of horned owl, given its resemblance to the words buza, buxa and buas, but Francis Celoria noted that a bird sacred to Leucothea would surely have to be some sort of seabird, a shearwater or a gull.

See also 

 Polyphonte
 Myrrha
 Hippolytus of Athens

References

Bibliography 
 Antoninus Liberalis, The Metamorphoses of Antoninus Liberalis translated by Francis Celoria (Routledge 1992). Online version at the Topos Text Project.
 

Aegean Sea in mythology
Deeds of Artemis
Deeds of Athena
Deeds of Hermes
Metamorphoses into birds in Greek mythology